Hamuro is a Japanese surname. Notable people with the surname include:

, Japanese concubine
, Japanese poet
, Japanese swimmer

Japanese-language surnames